is a common Japanese given name used by either sex.

Possible writings
Katsumi can be written using different kanji characters and can mean:
as a given name
克己, "overcome, self/oneself"
克巳, "overcome, sixth earthly branch"
克美, "overcome, beauty"
勝己, "win, self/oneself"
勝巳, "win, sixth earthly branch"
勝美, "win, beauty"
勝実, "win, substance (or fruit)"
The name can also be written in hiragana or katakana.
as a surname
勝見, "win, look"

People with the name
, Japanese sumo wrestler
, Japanese art director
, Japanese voice actor
, Japanese high jumper
, Japanese volleyball player
, Japanese swimmer
, Japanese film director
, Japanese volleyball player
, Japanese football player
, Japanese diplomat
, Japanese field hockey player
, Japanese voice actor
, Japanese actor
, Japanese voice actor
, Japanese cinematographer
, Japanese baseball player
, Japanese racing driver
, Japanese rower
, Japanese video game designer
, Japanese footballer
Céline Tran (born 1979), stage names either Katsumi or Katsuni, French pornographic actress

People with the surname
, one of the victims killed by Norio Nagayama
, the 2016 champion of the All Japan Kendo Championship
, Captain of the Japanese destroyer Tanikaze (1940)

Fictional characters
Katsumi Akagi (カツミ), a character in the manga and anime series Project ARMS
Katsumi Kabuto (克美), a character in the manga series Tenjho Tenge
Katsumi Kajio (克美), a character in the tokusatsu series Ultraman Gaia
Katsumi Kelly, a character in the 1957 film Sayonara
Katsumi Daido, a character in the 2010 movie Kamen Rider W Forever: A to Z/The Gaia Memories of Fate
Katsumi Kida (克美), a character in the tokusatsu series Kamen Rider Black
Katsumi Liqueur, a character in the manga and anime series Silent Möbius
Katsumi Sako (克己), a character in the manga and live-action drama series Life
Katsumi Orochi, a character in the manga and anime series Grappler Baki

Japanese unisex given names
Japanese-language surnames